Hans Peter Korff (born 24 August 1942) is a German actor.

Life 
Korff studied at Hochschule für Musik und Theater Hamburg. In Germany Korff works as an actor in cinema-, tv-films and tv-series. Since 1992 Korff is married with German actress Christiane Leuchtmann.

Filmography

Cinema

Television

References

External links 

 

German male film actors
German male television actors
21st-century German male actors
20th-century German male actors
1942 births
Male actors from Hamburg
Living people